César Ibáñez may refer to:

 César Ibáñez (footballer, born 1992), Mexican full-back
 César Ibáñez (footballer, born 1999), Argentine left-back